Wojciech Krzysztof (Wojtek) Karolak (28 May 1939 – 23 June 2021) was a Hammond B-3 organist who referred to himself as "an American jazz and rhythm and blues musician, born by mistake in Middle Europe". He also played saxophone and piano professionally.

Karolak was born Warsaw, Poland. In 1958, he began performing with the band the 'Jazz Believers' playing alto saxophone. The Jazz Believers consisted of the pianists Andrzej Trzaskowski and Krzysztof Komeda, Trafica Giant, and multi-instrumentalist Jan "Ptaszyn" Wróblewski.

Next, Wojciech Karolak played tenor saxophone in Andrzej Trzaskowski's The Wreckers. In 1961, Karolak switched from saxophone back to piano. In 1962, he formed his own trio and started recording his own music. This trio became the premier jazz band in Poland and backed most Western/American artists visiting Poland, among them Annie Ross, Ray Charles, and Don Ellis, with whom he recorded. In 1963, he started playing with "Ptaszyn" Wróblewski's Polish Jazz Quartet. The same year, Karolak recorded a quinet album with leader Andrzej Kurylewicz (trumpet) and Wróblewski (tenor sax/flute) entitled called Go Right.

In 1965, Karolak left Poland for Sweden where he lived until 1972. He began to play the Hammond organ only in 1967 and, after hearing Chick Corea, took up the Fender Rhodes electric piano in 1970.

He played rock and blues in music clubs in order to, in his own words, "make enough money to buy an apartment and a Hammond B-3", which he eventually bought in 1973. From then on, Karolak spent more time composing and arranging though he did continue to collaborate and perform with others. He performed with violinist Michał Urbaniak jazz-rock group after his return to Poland, and toured Europe during 1973 and 1974, and worked in trios with Zbigniew Namysłowski and Czesław Bartkowski in the same period. While in Western Europe he also played with Red Mitchell, Putte Wickman, Leroy Lowe and others. He then returned to Poland and co-led the group Mainstream and worked as a composer-arranger for the Polish Radio Studio Jazz Orchestra.

In the 1980s, he established, with Tomasz Szukalski and Czeslaw Bartkowski, a "superformation": 'Time Killers'. The resulting recording was voted the best Polish jazz record of the decade.

From the 1990s, Karolak played with the guitarist Jarosław Śmietana (admired by Pat Metheny among others), and recorded three records with him. With Piotr Baron and Zbigniew Lewandowski, Karolak started The High Bred Jazz Trio. He played in numerous concerts with Leszek Cichoński's Guitar Workshop and continued to write, arrange, and perform in Poland and abroad.

Polish President Aleksander Kwaśniewski awarded him the Knight's Cross of the Order of Polonia Restituta, Poland's second highest civilian honor after the Order of the White Eagle.

Music for films
 1981: Filip z konopi – music, conductor
 1981: Konopielka – music
 1983: Bardzo spokojna wieś – music
 1983: Szczęśliwy brzeg – music, performance
 1984: Miłość z listy przebojów – music, conductor
 1985: Przyłbice i kaptury – music, performance
 1991: Niech żyje miłość – performance

References

Feather, Leonard & Gitler, Ira. The Encyclopedia of Jazz Horizon Press 1976

External links
 
 

1939 births
2021 deaths
Knights of the Order of Polonia Restituta
Male jazz composers
Male organists
Male pianists
Musicians from Warsaw
Polish jazz musicians
Polish jazz organists
Polish composers
Polish jazz pianists
21st-century male musicians
21st-century organists
21st-century pianists